Xisha Bridge is a 217 metre high arch bridge near the city of Lianghezhen, Chongqing China. The main ribs are composed of concrete filled steel tubes.  The span is the highest through arch in the world.  The bridge crosses the Xisha River (Xi Shahe), a tributary of the larger Apeng River (Apengjiang). The bridge is located on G65 Baotou–Maoming Expressway which has several other bridges over 200 meters high including the Aizhai Bridge and the Wulingshan Bridge.

See also
List of highest bridges in the world

External links
http://www.highestbridges.com/wiki/index.php?title=Xisha_Bridge

Arch bridges in China
Bridges in Chongqing
Bridges completed in 2010